USS Halsey (DDG-97) is an  guided missile destroyer in the United States Navy.

Construction
Built in Pascagoula, Mississippi, the ship and crew were completely certified and "surge ready" 17 January 2006, nearly a year faster than previous DDGs.

Operational history

Halsey departed for her maiden deployment 6 August 2006 under her second commanding officer, Commander Pinckney. 2 November 2006 Halsey visited Kagoshima, Japan. That night, after a party for visiting local Japanese dignitaries, during which on-duty crew were drinking, there was a fire which damaged one of the main reduction gears. An incomplete report was filed and months later another fire and explosion brought to light the extent of the first fire.  The ship's commander was relieved and the damage to the ship was $8.5 million. Halsey returned 24 December 2006, having worked with the Kitty Hawk Carrier Strike Group and taking part in ANNUALEX.

Commander Paul J. Schlise took command of Halsey March 2007.

Commander Robert Beauchamp took command of Halsey on 17 August 2008.

Halsey departed Naval Base San Diego for her second deployment on 4 May 2008 for a deployment to the Persian Gulf. After six months and numerous port visits Halsey returned home to San Diego on 3 November 2008.

Halsey, homeported in San Diego, was part of  Expeditionary Strike Group assigned to deploy to the U.S. 5th Fleet area of operations to conduct maritime security operations (MSO). MSO help develop security in the maritime environment, which promotes stability and global prosperity. These operations complement the counterterrorism and security efforts of regional nations and seek to disrupt violent extremists' use of the maritime environment as a venue for attack or to transport personnel, weapons or other material.

Awards
 Navy Unit Commendation - (Sep 2010-Mar 2011)
 Navy Meritorious Unit Commendation - (Nov 2011-May 2012)
 Navy E Ribbon - (2011)

Namesake
Halsey is named in honor of Fleet Admiral William Frederick "Bull" Halsey Jr. Halsey was commissioned 30 July 2005 at Naval Air Station North Island, Coronado, California, under commanding officer Commander James L. Autrey.

In popular culture
In the fall of 2012, USS Halsey served as a filming location for the TNT television series The Last Ship and its setting, USS Nathan James (DDG-151).

References

External links

Official ship's site

NavSource Online: USS Halsey

 

Arleigh Burke-class destroyers
Destroyers of the United States
Ships built in Pascagoula, Mississippi
2004 ships